"These Living Arms" is a song by Canadian rock band The Tea Party. It was released as a promotional single in Canada.

Track listing 
"These Living Arms (edit)"
"These Living Arms"

References 

2000 singles
The Tea Party songs
2000 songs